Annona atabapensis is a species of plant in the Annonaceae family. It is endemic to Venezuela.

References

Flora of Venezuela
atabapensis
Vulnerable plants
Taxonomy articles created by Polbot